Wee Chong Jin  (28 September 1915 – 5 June 2005) was a Malayan-born Singaporean judge who served as the first chief justice of Singapore between 1963 and 1990. He was appointed by President Yusof Ishak, and took office on 5 January 1963. He was the longest-serving chief justice in the Commonwealth.

Born in Penang, Malaysia, he was the first Asian lawyer to be appointed a Judge of the Supreme Court of Singapore. Having served as the chief justice of Singapore for 27 years, Wee was the longest-serving chief justice in the Commonwealth.

Early life

Wee was born in Penang to parents Wee Gim Puay and Lim Paik Yew. He received his early education at the Penang Free School, and read law at St John's College, Cambridge. He was called to Bar at the Middle Temple in November 1938, and was admitted as an Advocate and Solicitor of Straits Settlements in 1940 upon returning to Penang.

Legal career

Wee practised law in Malaysia and Singapore from 1940 to 1957, with the firm Wee Swee Teow and Co.

Judicial career 
Wee became the first Asian lawyer to be appointed to the position of a judge at the Supreme Court of Singapore on 15 August 1957, and subsequently appointed Chief Justice of Singapore on 5 January 1963. His appointment as Chief Justice marked the end of the century-old tradition of appointing British Chief Justices – the last of whom was Sir Alan Rose – for Singapore. Wee remained in the position for 27 years, making him the longest-serving chief justice not only in Singapore, but also in the Commonwealth.

Other roles

Wee also served as the first chairman of the Presidential Council for Minority Rights from 1973 and remained at its helm for 18 years. Wee assumed the post of the acting President of Singapore for two days when Devan Nair stepped down as President. Wee Chong Jin had also stepped in when Singapore's heads of state were either away or indisposed. He had stood in for Yusof Ishak when he was Yang di-Pertuan Negara and also for President Benjamin Sheares. He was the first president of the Singapore Academy of Law in 1988. In August 1991, he was awarded the Distinguished Service Order. In April 1992, Wee was made an Honorary Member and Fellow of the Singapore Academy of Law for life – the highest honour made to a person by the Academy. He served as a legal consultant of the Supreme Court of Singapore after his retirement on 27 September 1990, and was diagnosed with lung cancer in 2004.

Personal life

Wee was also known for his love for sports, as he was an outstanding cricketer for Cambridge University in 1937 and a keen golfer serving as President of the Singapore Golf Association from 1962 to 2002.

Wee died on 5 June 2005 of complications from lung and brain cancer. A funeral was held at the Catholic Church of St. Ignatius at King's Road in Bukit Timah before his body was cremated at the Mandai Crematorium. Wee is survived by his wife, Cecilia Henderson, three sons, Laurence, John and Patrick, and one daughter, Veronica, and his grandchildren, Laura, Nicole, David and Michael.

Honour

Honour of Malaysia
  : Commander of the Order of the Defender of the Realm (P.M.N.) (1965)

See also
Chief Justice of Singapore
Judicial officers of the Republic of Singapore
Judicial system of Singapore

References

Singaporean people of Chinese descent
1915 births
Singaporean people of Hokkien descent
2005 deaths
Alumni of St John's College, Cambridge
20th-century Singaporean judges
Malaysian emigrants to Singapore
People who lost Malaysian citizenship
Singaporean Roman Catholics
Malaysian people of Hokkien descent
Malaysian people of Chinese descent
Naturalised citizens of Singapore
Chief justices of Singapore
Members of the Middle Temple
Deaths from brain cancer in Singapore
Deaths from lung cancer in Singapore
Commanders of the Order of the Defender of the Realm
Malaysian expatriates in the United Kingdom
Presidents of Singapore
People from Penang